The Best (Of) is a compilation album of German power metal band Gamma Ray, released on 30 January 2015.

The Best (Of) has been released as 2-disc Standard Edition, 4-vinyl-Gatefold, and a high-quality 2-disc Limited Edition in an elaborate and exclusive leather-style package. 
All tracks were remastered in 2014 by Eike Freese.

Tracklisting

References

2015 compilation albums
Gamma Ray (band) albums
Power metal compilation albums